The Virginia Slims of Moscow (after the title sponsor of that year's WTA tour) was a women's tennis tournament played on indoor carpet courts at the Olympic Stadium in Moscow, Soviet Union, that was part of the Category 2 tier of the 1989 Virginia Slims World Championship Series (1989 WTA Tour).

It was held from October 8 through 15, 1989. It was the inaugural edition of the WTA tournament later known as the St. Petersburg Open and the Moscow Ladies Open.

Finals

Singles 
 Gretchen Magers defeated  Natasha Zvereva 6–3, 6–4
 It was Magers's 1st WTA singles title of the year and the 3rd and last of her career.

Doubles 
 Larisa Savchenko /  Natasha Zvereva defeated  Nathalie Herreman /  Catherine Suire 6–3, 6–4
 It was Savchenko/Zvereva's 4th WTA doubles title of the year and the 6th of the pair's career.

References

External links 
 

Virginia Slims of Moscow
Moscow Ladies Open
1989 in Soviet sport
October 1989 sports events in Europe